Minnesota Scientific and Natural Areas (SNAs) are public lands in the state of Minnesota that have been permanently protected to preserve any one or combination of the following:
 Native plant and animal communities
 Rare species
 Places of biodiversity significance
 Geological features or formations
 Seasonal havens for wildlife and vantage points for observing them
 Successional processes
 Relict flora or fauna
 Fossil evidence
The SNA Program is housed within the Division of Ecological and Water Resources at the Minnesota Department of Natural Resources. The primary goal of the program is to ensure that none of Minnesota's natural heritage is lost from any ecological region of the state. The secondary goal is to provide opportunities for compatible scientific research, education, and nature-based recreation. The Program currently oversees 166 SNAs.

See also
 Geology of Minnesota
 List of ecoregions in Minnesota
 Natural history of Minnesota
 Wisconsin State Natural Areas Program, a similar program in Wisconsin.

References

External links
 Index of Scientific and Natural Areas at Minnesota Department of Natural Resources
 Minnesota Scientific and Natural Areas information at the University of Minnesota

Protected areas of Minnesota